is a single by Japanese pop duo Dreams Come True, from their fifteenth studio album, Do You Dreams Come True? (2009), released on November 12, 2009 through Universal Music Japan. The title track was written by the band's singer and songwriter Miwa Yoshida, and produced by Masato Nakamura. The single debuted at number one on the Oricon Singles Chart, becoming the group's first single to top the chart in ten years. It has sold about 86,000 copies in Japan and has been certified Gold by the Recording Industry Association of Japan (RIAJ).

Track listing

Charts and certifications

Sales and certifications

References

2008 songs
2008 singles
Japanese-language songs
Universal Music Group singles
Dreams Come True (band) songs
Billboard Japan Hot 100 number-one singles
Oricon Weekly number-one singles